Berkay Ömer Öğretir (born 16 February 1998) is a Turkish swimmer. He competed in the men's 200 metre breaststroke event at the 2018 FINA World Swimming Championships (25 m), in Hangzhou, China.

References

External links
 

1998 births
Living people
Turkish male breaststroke swimmers
Place of birth missing (living people)
Swimmers at the 2018 Mediterranean Games
Mediterranean Games medalists in swimming
Mediterranean Games gold medalists for Turkey
Mediterranean Games bronze medalists for Turkey
Swimmers at the 2020 Summer Olympics
Olympic swimmers of Turkey
21st-century Turkish people
Swimmers at the 2022 Mediterranean Games